Giardino is Italian for garden. It may refer to:

Giardino (album), 2011 album by Finnish krautrock band Circle
Giardino Bellini, urban park of Catania, Italy
Giardino, Capalbio, village in the province of Grosseto, Italy
Il Giardino Armonico, Italian early music ensemble who use period instruments
Palazzo del Giardino, historic palace in Parma, Italy
Santi Angeli Custodi a Città Giardino (Holy Guardian Angels), church on Via Alpi Apuane, Rome
Villa Giardino, town in the province of Córdoba, Argentina

People with the surname
Gaetano Giardino (1864–1935), Italian soldier who became Marshal of Italy during World War I
Patrik Giardino (born 1966), Swedish photographer and director based in America
Vittorio Giardino (born 1946), Italian comic artist, author of Little Ego
Walter Giardino (born 1960), Argentine guitarist, composer, and leader of the heavy metal and hard rock band Rata Blanca

it:Giardino